{{Infobox UK place
 | static_image_name         = Northwich - Town Bridge.jpg
 | static_image_caption      = Town Bridge, the River Weaver and the spire of Holy Trinity Church 
 | official_name             = Northwich
 | country                   = England
 | region                    = North West England
 | population                = 50,531
 | population_ref            = (2021)<ref name="2021 Census">
Northwich is a town and civil parish in the unitary authority of Cheshire West and Chester in the ceremonial county of Cheshire, England. It lies in the heart of the Cheshire Plain, at the confluence of the rivers Weaver and Dane.

The population of the civil parish was 20,924 in 2021 and the wider built-up area (which also covers parts of several other civil parishes) was 50,531.  

The area around Northwich has been exploited for its salt pans since Roman times, when the settlement was known as Condate. The town has been severely affected by salt mining, and subsidence has historically been a significant problem. Mine stabilisation work was completed in 2007.

History

Early history
During Roman times, Northwich was known as Condate, thought to be a Latinisation of a Brittonic name meaning "Confluence". There are several other sites of the same name, mostly in France; in Northwich's case, it lies at the junction of the rivers Dane and Weaver.

Northwich can be identified through two contemporary Roman documents. The first of these is the Antonine Itinerary, a 3rd-century road map split into 14 sections. Two of these sections, or Itinerary, mention Condate: Route II ("the route from the Wall to the port of Rutupiae") and Route X ("the route from Glannoventa to Mediolanum"). The second document is the 7th-century Ravenna Cosmography. This document refers to Condate between the entries for Salinae (now Middlewich, Cheshire) and Ratae (now Leicester, Leicestershire), at the time the capital of the Corieltauvi tribe.

The Romans' interest in the Northwich area is thought to be due to the strategic river crossing and the location of the salt brines. Salt was very important in Roman society; the Roman word salarium, linked employment, salt and soldiers, but the exact link is unclear. It is also theorised that this is the basis for the modern word salary. Another theory is that the word soldier itself comes from the Latin sal dare (to give salt).  See History of salt for further details. There is archaeological evidence of a Roman auxiliary fort within the area of Northwich now known as "Castle" dated to AD 70.  This and other northwestern forts were built as the Romans moved north from their stronghold in Chester.

The association with salt continues in the etymology of Northwich. The "wich" (or wych) suffix applies to other towns in the area: Middlewich, Nantwich and Leftwich. This is considered to have been derived from the Norse, wic, for bay, and is associated with the more traditional method of obtaining salt by evaporating sea water. Therefore, a place for making salt became a wych-house; Northwich was the most northern of the -wich towns in Cheshire.

Medieval to early modern
The existence of Northwich in the early medieval period is shown by its record in the Domesday Book:

The manor of Northwich belonged to the Earls of Chester until 1237 when the family line died out. Subsequently, Northwich became a royal manor and was given to a noble family to collect tolls in exchange for a set rent.

The Cheshire archers were a body of elite soldiers noted for their skills with the longbow that fought in many engagements in Britain and France in the Middle Ages, Battles at which there were sizeable numbers of Cheshire archers include Agincourt and Crecy, many of these archers hailed from the Northwich Hundred. Richard II employed a bodyguard of these yeoman archers who came from the Macclesfield Hundred and the forest districts of Cheshire.

That salt production continued throughout the centuries and can be seen through John Leland's description of the town in 1540:

Between 1642 and 1643, during the English Civil War, Northwich was fortified and garrisoned by Sir William Brereton for the Parliamentarians.

The salt beds beneath Northwich were re-discovered in the 1670s by employees of the local Smith-Barry family.  The Smith-Barrys were looking for coal, but instead discovered rock salt, in the grounds of the family home, Marbury Hall, to the north of Northwich.

19th century

During the 19th century it became uneconomical to mine for the salt. Instead hot water was pumped through the mines, which dissolved the salt. The resultant brine was pumped out and the salt extracted from the brine. This technique weakened the mines and led to land subsidence as they collapsed. Subsidence affected the town and the surrounding landscape. For example, collapses in 1880 formed Witton Flash as the River Weaver flowed into a huge hole caused by subsidence. Subsidence also allegedly accounts for many old timber-framed houses in the town centre, which were better able to withstand the movement of the ground. Some houses were built on a base of steel girders that could be jacked up to level the house with each change in the underlying ground. The town's historical link with the salt industry is celebrated in its museum, which is today in the old workhouse.

In 1874, John Brunner and Ludwig Mond founded Brunner Mond in Winnington and started manufacturing soda ash using the Solvay ammonia-soda process. This process used salt as a main raw material. The chemical industry used the subsided land for the disposal of waste from the manufacture of soda-ash. The waste was transported through a network of cranes and rails to the produce limebeds. This was a dangerous alkaline substance and caused the landscape to be abandoned as unusable.

Modern development

In 1975 Marbury Country Park was the first area to be reclaimed from dereliction and has become a popular recreational area. In 1987 more land was reclaimed to form Furey Wood and over later years, Cheshire County Council's Land Regeneration Unit reclaimed what is now known as Anderton Nature Park, Witton Flash, Dairy House Meadows, Witton Mill Meadows, and Ashton's and Neumann's Flashes.

In February 2004 a £28 million programme to stabilise the abandoned salt mines underneath Northwich was begun.  The work was funded by the English Partnerships through its Land Stabilisation Programme, introduced to resolve issues associated with unstable mines around England.

The four mines identified for work were Baron's Quay, Witton Bank, Neumann's and Penny's Lane. These mines were chosen because their subsidence was causing problems for the town centre. The stabilisation plan involved removing millions of litres of brine from the four mines and replacing it with a mixture of pulverised fuel ash (PFA), cement and salt. The project was completed in late 2007.

The old Magistrates Court and Memorial Hall have been demolished and been replaced by Memorial Court, a £12.5 million cultural and leisure centre, which offers a pool, dance studios and a gym.

As of January 2023 roughly half of the retail space remains empty.

A major fire occurred at the Northwich Outdoor Market on 3 January 2020. The Market's remains were quickly demolished and so far there are no plans to rebuild it.

Governance
At the time of the Domesday survey (1086) Northwich was in the hundred of Middlewich, but by the 14th century it had become part of the Northwich hundred. This probably happened during the reorganisation of the Hundreds in the 12th century.  Northwich has been described as a borough from around 1288, though there is no surviving borough charter.

Northwich originally constituted an area of only  at the confluence of the Rivers Weaver and Dane. The much larger township of Witton cum Twambrooks lay to the east, Leftwich to the south, Castle Northwich to the south-west, and Winnington to the north-west.

The manor of Northwich was granted to the Stanley family, later Earls of Derby in 1484, and stayed in the family's hands until the late 18th century. A local board was founded on 26 June 1863 after the Local Government Act 1858 and it purchased the manor from Arthur Heywood Esq. in 1871. In 1875, the local boards for Northwich and Witton cum Twambrooks were amalgamated, and the resultant district was further extended in 1880 to include the whole of Castle Northwich and parts of Hartford, Winnington and Leftwich. On 10 September 1894 these areas were united as the civil parish of Northwich, served by Northwich Urban District Council.

The town was further enlarged in 1936 by the addition of parts of Winnington, Lostock Gralam, Barnton, Leftwich and Rudheath, and again in 1955 when parts of Davenham, Hartford, Rudheath and Whatcroft were added.

The Local Government Act 1972 replaced the Urban District Council of Northwich with a new district (later borough) council: Vale Royal. Vale Royal covered areas previously covered by Northwich UDC (Urban District Council), Northwich RDC (Rural District Council), Winsford UDC and parts of Runcorn RDC. Northwich Town Council now has the powers of a parish council and is now made up of five main districts of Leftwich, Northwich, Castle, Winnington and Witton. In 2018 Northwich Town Council won 'Council of the Year' at the NALC Star Council Awards. The current Town Clerk of Northwich Town Council is Chris Shaw. 

Vale Royal Borough Council was abolished on 1 April 2009, and Northwich now falls within the new unitary authority of Cheshire West and Chester.

Between 1885 and 1983 Northwich gave its name to a parliamentary constituency. Northwich was also split between the Tatton and Eddisbury constituencies until the formation of Weaver Vale for the 1997 general election. The seat is currently held by Mike Amesbury (Labour).

The town coat of arms features the Latin motto "Sal est Vita" meaning "Salt is Life", which can be seen on the town's crest of arms. The town is twinned with Dole in France.

Geography

Northwich is situated in the Cheshire Plain at coordinates h (53.255, −2.522). Northwich is surrounded by the following civil parishes, starting due north and proceeding in a clockwise direction: Anderton with Marbury, Marston, Wincham, Lostock Gralam, Rudheath, Davenham, Hartford, Weaverham, Barnton.

Two rivers meet in the town centre, the Weaver and the Dane. The town is surrounded by undulating pasture. Subsidence and the collapse of underground saltworks has created flashes and there are also local meres – for example, to the north is Budworth Mere and to the north-east is Pick Mere.

Demographics

The population of Northwich in 1664 has been estimated as 560. The population of Northwich over the last 200 years has been:

The 2011 Census shows the population of Northwich civil parish to be 19,924. This was composed of 9,878 (49.6%) males and 10,046 (50.4%) females. There were 8,808 households. This makes the average household size 2.62, an increase on 2001.

The adjacent civil parishes of Anderton with Marbury, Barnton, Davenham, Hartford, Kingsmead, Lostock Gralam, Rudheath, Weaverham and Wincham are in part built up, giving a total population of 53,391 in 2011 considered to use the facilities of Northwich town centre.

The population of Northwich is estimated at around 63,000 in 2021, The town forms part of the Cheshire West and Chester (Northwich and Winsford Locality) which has an estimated 2021 population of 107,000. Northwich and its urban area make up 63,000, Winsford makes up around 34,100 and the remaining 10,000 are the surrounding rural areas of the locality

Economics

Northwich has been described as having a market since at least 1535, when it was described as a market town by Leland, but there is no surviving charter. The town still has a market today, which is earmarked for refurbishment as part of the Northwich Vision plans.

The town's economy was dominated by the salt industry. However, a list of tolls for goods crossing over Northwich bridge in 1353 shows goods coming into the town, including a wide range of carcasses, fleeces, hides and skins, cloth, fish, alcoholic drinks, dairy products, building materials, household goods, metals and glass, and millstones. This indicates a much wider economic base to medieval Northwich than just the salt trade. Documentary evidence also exists for a mill from 1332 onwards and there is evidence for more than one mill from 1343.

Allied to the extraction of salt was a bulk chemical industry, which became concentrated at the three ICI sites at Winnington, Wallerscote and Lostock. The first industrially practical method for producing polythene was accidentally discovered at the Winnington Laboratory in 1933.

Bakers Frank Roberts & Sons have been associated with the town since 1887 and continues to be based near the town at Rudheath on the A556. Two of Frank Roberts & Sons's three main business divisions, Roberts Bakery and The Little Treats Co, are based in Northwich and Aldred's The Bakers, is in Ilkeston, Derbyshire.

There are many contemporary major employers in nearby Rudheath and Hartford.

Based on the 2001 Census, Northwich had 13,928 people aged between 16 and 74. Of these, 8,908 (64.0%) people were categorised as economically active; 4,268 (30.6%) were economically inactive; 455 (3.3%) were unemployed.

Culture and community
The town has three key annual events. Over the August Bank Holiday weekend, Northwich Festival is held at Moss Farm Sports Complex, featuring four days of music and sport. Since 2011, the town's Medieval Festival has been staged in Verdin Park. And since 2021, an annual Piña Colada Festival has taken place in recognition of Rupert Holmes who was born in the town and wrote Escape (The Piña Colada Song), released in 1979. The festival grew in 2022, with live music, fairground rides and old school street games among other attractions. Local bars, restaurants and cafés offered piña coladas alongside other tropical themed drinks and snacks. 

Northwich Memorial Hall was opened in 1960 but closed for redevelopment in 2013, to be replaced by the Memorial Court Facility, opened in 2015. It hosted a range of activities, including the Purple Cactus Comedy Club.

The Harlequin Theatre produces six plays each year, and it is also the home of Northwich Folk Club (which has run continuously since 1977).

The Regal cinema closed in 2007 and was demolished. A cinema in the Barons Quay development opened in 2016.

Northwich has two local newspapers: the Northwich Guardian, published by Newsquest, and the Northwich Chronicle, published by Trinity Mirror. Radio station Shout Radio broadcasts online and covers the mid-Cheshire area including Northwich (territory previously covered by the now defunct Cheshire FM).

Northwich musicians include Steve Hewitt, drummer with Placebo, which provided a song for the soundtrack to the film Cruel Intentions, and Tim Burgess from the Charlatans, a band once managed by Steve Harrison from the town's Omega Music record store.

Local horror author Stuart Neild's first novel, A Haunted Man, was set in the salt mines that run underneath Northwich, combining fact with supernatural fiction. Neild's novels featuring Northwich and other North West locations. A Hollywood film and television series was in development.

Sport
Northwich is the home of three non-league football teams: Witton Albion, Northwich Victoria and 1874 Northwich. In May 2018 the Cheshire FA announced plans for a £70m development near Northwich, modelled on St George's Park National Football Centre. The facility would include two FIFA-standard pitches with a 1000-seat stadium, 3G pitches, six grass pitches, full medical facilities and a hotel/spa.

The town has two rugby union sides Northwich RUFC and Winnington Park.

The area also boasts several amateur cricket clubs, including Winnington Park CC, Davenham CC, Weaverham CC, Northwich CC and Hartford CC. Northwich also has a successful competitive swim team – Northwich Swimming Club, first formed in the late 19th century.

Northwich Rowing Club was formed in 1875 in Northwich and continues to row on the River Weaver, producing Olympic and international rowers such as Matt Langridge. The club has its own boat and clubhouse located by The Crescent and holds three events every year, the Autumn Head in November, the Spring Head in April and the Regatta in May. In 2015 the club was the first rowing club from the north of England to win the Junior Coxed Quad Sculls at the Head of the River Fours on the tideway in London. Club crews have also competed in the Henley Royal Regatta, with a crew seeded in 2015 for the first time in the club's history. The club also has a large junior section taking rowers on from age 12.

The Northwich Festival, held at Moss Farm Sports Complex each August includes the UK Strongman-North Competition.

The town also has a long-standing cycling club, Weaver Valley CC. Established in 1962, its members included ex-pro and ITV commentator Paul Sherwen and domestic rider Alan Kemp. The club competes in road racing, time trials, track racing and off-road. The club promotes three road races, a series of circuit races in June at Oulton Park, the Cat and Fiddle hill climb, and cyclo-cross in September. Since 1980, the club has promoted the Cheshire Classic women's cycling road race, held every April. Part of British Cycling's National Road Race Series, it is the longest running race on the women's national calendar. Previous winners include Dame Sarah Storey, Lucy Garner, Lizzie Armitstead, Nicole Cooke and Mandy Jones.

The first known swimming baths in Northwich was the Verdin Baths, situated on Verdin Park, presented by Robert Verdin in commemoration of the Jubilee of Queen Victoria in 1887. It consisted of a  cast-iron plunge bath and five slipper baths. Northwich Public Baths was built in 1913 following subsidence at Verdin Park pool. It its doors on 23 January 1991  to be replaced with Moss Farm leisure complex, which in turn was replaced by Memorial Court entertainment and leisure venue in 2015.

Landmarks and religious sites

The parish church is known as St. Helen's Witton. It is a Grade I Listed Building. The church initially developed as a chapel of ease associated with the parish of Great Budworth to serve the local community, known as the Chapel of Witton. There is no known date for the creation of this chapel, but it is thought to have existed in the 13th century. None of this building exists in the current church. There is no documentary evidence to indicate the dates of the older parts of the current building. However, stones in the fabric of the porch carry inscriptions attributed to "Ricardus Alkoke Capellanus". This name matches documents concerning land in Northwich and Lostock Gralam dated 1468, but this cannot be used to date the church accurately.

It was not until 7 August 1900 that the parish of Witton (otherwise Northwich) was formed from parts of Great Budworth, Davenham and other surrounding parishes.

The present St Wilfrid's (Roman Catholic) church was built in 1866. The current Northwich Methodist Chapel was opened in 1990, but there has been a Methodist presence in the town at least since 1774, when John Wesley laid the foundation stone of the first chapel in the London Road area.

The Northwich Union Workhouse opened in 1837 following the Poor Law Amendment of 1834 that standardised the system of poor relief throughout Britain. The building is now the Weaver Hall Museum.

The Dock Road Edwardian Pumping Station is a Grade II Listed Building originally built by Northwich Urban District Council in 1913. For over 60 years it was used for pumping sewage from parts of Northwich to the Wallerscote Treatment Works. Before it was built, untreated sewage was discharged directly into the River Weaver, causing widespread pollution.

Two swing bridges, Hayhurst Bridge built in 1898, and Town Bridge built in 1899, cross the Weaver at Northwich. The bridges were the first two electrically powered swing bridges in Great Britain and were built on floating pontoons to counteract the mine subsidence. They were designed by Colonel John Saner.

The Floatel Northwich was moored on the Weaver near the confluence of the two rivers, but was closed when the owners, The Real Hotel Company plc, went into administration in January 2009. It has since been removed. It was the UK's only floating hotel.

Transport

The key historical mode of transport is water. The Trent and Mersey Canal, opened in 1775, passed to the north of Northwich because of objections from the trustees of the Weaver Navigation. However, the canal passed salt deposits near the village of Marston, and many of the later salt mines were based along its banks including the Lion Salt Works. The Anderton Boat Lift was opened in 1875 to connect the canal and river systems. It was fully restored in 2002 and now houses a visitor centre.

The road system around Northwich can be dated back to the Roman times. The A556 and A559 follow the route of the Roman road that runs from Chester to York. The A556 diverts away from the route of the Roman road following a new route to the south of the town acting as the town's bypass. The Chester to Manchester road became a Turnpike in 1769. The A530, known as King Street, also passes near to the town, and this follows the route of the Roman road that connected Warrington and Middlewich. The old route to Warrington and the north from Middlewich, however, was replaced by a new route through Knutsford, which became a turnpike in 1753. Northwich is connected to the motorway network to the north of the town via the A559 onto the M56 motorway; and to the east of the town via the A556 at Junction 19 of the M6 motorway.

The railway came to the town in 1863 when the Cheshire Midland Railway constructed its line from Knutsford. The West Cheshire Railway built its line to Helsby in 1869. Passenger trains from Northwich to Chester via Delamere commenced in 1875. The route through Northwich is now marketed as the Mid-Cheshire line. Northwich railway station, last rebuilt in 1897, is on the line from Chester to Manchester Piccadilly. There are also stations within close vicinity at Greenbank, also on the Mid-Cheshire line, and Hartford (on the West Coast Main Line).

There are bus routes between Northwich and a number of local towns, and villages including Weaverham, Hartford, Crewe, Warrington, Kelsall and Chester.

Family run coach company, Walker's Coaches, was based in Anderton, before being taken over by Holmeswood Coaches; who still run the Northwich depot.

Education

Northwich and its surroundings has a number of schools and colleges. Sir John Deane's College is now a sixth form college, but was originally formed as a grammar school in 1557. The school was originally known as Witton Grammar School and was erected close to Witton Chapel. The school moved to its current location, to the south of the town, in 1907–08. The Grange School, Northwich is an independent school.
Primary education include:
The Grange Junior School
Witton Church Walk CofE Primary School
Victoria Road Primary School
Charles Darwin Community Primary School
Winnington Park Community Primary and Nursery School
St Wilfrid's Catholic Primary School
Hartford Manor Primary School
Hartford County Primary School
Kingsmead Primary School was shortlisted for the Prime Minister's Better Public Building award in 2005.
Rosebank School is a school for autistic children aged 3–11 years.

During the 19th century many new schools were founded and by 1850 twelve "academies" were recorded in the area. The town is now served by County High School Leftwich, a specialist media arts college, while Rudheath Senior Academy, a specialist performing arts college and Hartford High School both admit pupils from Northwich. There are also several primary schools in the area. St. Nicholas Catholic High School is also in the local vicinity, and performs well on national exam boards, coming second in the whole of Cheshire.

Mid Cheshire College had its main campus in nearby Hartford, offering further education courses. The campus closed in 2018 after it merged with Warrington Collegiate a year earlier to form Warrington and Vale Royal College

In November 2005, as part of the Northwich Vision, a refurbishment of the town's railway station included a Centre called Zone that promotes lifelong learning by offering people the opportunity to access a range of online and taught courses.

Notable people
 Industry

 Peter Drinkwater (1750 – 1801) an English cotton manufacturer and merchant. In 1782 he opened his first cotton mill on the River Weaver in Northwich
 Sir Joseph Verdin, 1st Baronet (1838 in Witton – 1920) ran a family salt business known as Joseph Verdin & Sons with his brothers, Robert and William, lived at The Brockhurst in the town.
 Ludwig Mond (1839–1909) German-born co-founder of Brunner Mond, a soda factory in Winnington
 Sir John Brunner, 1st Baronet  PC DL (1842–1919) founder of chemical firm Brunner Mond in 1873,  MP for Northwich 1885–1886 and from 1887 to 1910, lived at Winnington Hall
 William James Yarwood (1851–1926) shipbuilder and proprietor of W. J. Yarwood & Sons, a local shipbuilding business

Creative arts

 Alethea Lewis (1749 at Acton - 1827) an English novelist, she centred on profound Christianity and  virtue.
 Bob Crossley (1912 in Northwich – 2010) an abstract artist who worked in oil and acrylic and lived in Cornwall from 1959
 Percy M. Young (1912 in Northwich – 2004) a British musicologist, editor, organist, composer, conductor and teacher 
 Peter Gammond (born 1925 in Northwich) a British music critic, writer, journalist, musician, poet, and artist. 
 Robert Westall (1929–1993) the children's author lived in the town and taught at Sir John Deane's Grammar School.
 Sue Birtwistle (born 1945 in Northwich) a producer and writer of television drama 
 Rupert Holmes (born 1947 in Northwich) composer, songwriter and author, now lives in New York
 Malcolm Garrett (born 1956 in Northwich) a British graphic designer
 Jennifer Saunders (born 1958) actress and comedian, attended Northwich Girls' Grammar School
 Jim Tavaré (born 1963) an English stand-up comedian, actor, and musician. He attended art school in Northwich.
 Moira Buffini (born 1965) an English dramatist, director, and actor. 
 Tim Burgess (born 1967) an English singer-songwriter and lead singer of the alternative rock band The Charlatans
 Cathie Pilkington RA (born 1968) is a British sculptor, she attended the North Chester College of Art in Northwich
 Stuart Neild (born 1970 in Northwich) horror author 
 Steve Hewitt (born 1971 in Northwich) an English musician, singer-songwriter, record producer and  former drummer for the band Placebo, 1996–2007
 Helsinki Seven (formed 2006) are an alternative rock band from Northwich,
 Addictive (formed 2008) an English musical duo based in Northwich consists of Louise Bagan and Aisha Stuart

Politics

 Robert Verdin (1836 in Witton – 1887) a salt manufacturer, philanthropist and MP for Northwich 1886–1887 
 Sir Philip Holland (1917 in Northwich – 2011) Conservative MP for Acton 1959-1964 and for Carlton 1966-1983
 Paul Dean, Baron Dean of Harptree PC (1924 in Northwich – 2009) Conservative MP for North Somerset 1964 to 1983
 John Greenway (born 1946) MP for Ryedale, was born and educated in the town 
 Arron Banks (born 1966 in Northwich) a British businessman and political donor.
 Diana Johnson (born 1966) MP for Hull North was born and educated in the town

Sport

 Charles James Hughes (1853 in Northwich –1916) an English footballer, referee, and co-founder of Northwich Victoria
 George Elmore (1880 in Witton – 1916 Somme) an English professional football player with about 200 games.
 John Boden (1882 in Northwich – 1946) an English professional footballer who played over 300 pro games
 Billy Harrison (1886 in Wybunbury – 1948) an English footballer with over 400 appearances, mostly for Wolves
 Jack Eyres (1899 in Northwich – 1975) an English footballer who played over 250 games.
 Sid Collins Jr. (1912 in Northwich – 1983) an English professional golfer. He won the Welsh Professional Championship in 1938 and 1952
 Tom Manley (1912 in Northwich – 1988) an English professional footballer, over 300 appearances for Manchester United and Brentford, he later managed hometown club Northwich Victoria F.C.
 Zandra Nowell (born 1936 in Northwich) a British alpine skier, competed in the 1956 Winter Olympics
 Malcolm Arnold (born 1940 in Northwich) an athletics coach working for UK Athletics since 1974. 
 Len Bathurst (born 1959 in Northwich) an English former professional football player who appeared in over 350 games.
 Mike Whitlow (born 1968 in Northwich) an English former professional footballer with 398 appearances, mainly for Leicester City & Bolton Wanderers
 Michael Oakes (born 1973 in Northwich) former goalkeeper for Aston Villa and Wolverhampton Wanderers
 Andy Oakes (born 1977 in Northwich) former goalkeeper for Derby County
 Matt Langridge (born 1983) rower and triple Olympic medallist, including Gold at the Rowing at the 2016 Summer Olympics, started rowing at Northwich Rowing Club
 Mark Roberts (born 1983 in Northwich) is an English professional footballer played in 440 matches
 Craig Jones (1985–2008) an English motorcycle racer. He grew up in Northwich
 Dennis Walker (1944 in Northwich - 2003) an English footballer, the first black player to appear for Manchester United, also representing York City and Cambridge United
 Joe Dale (1921 in Northwich - 2000) an English professional footballer who played for Manchester United as well as Port Vale and Witton Albion

Other
 Eaton Hodgkinson FRS (1789 in Anderton – 1861) an English engineer, a pioneer of the application of mathematics to problems of structural design. 
 William Allen Whitworth (1840–1905) was an English mathematician and a priest in the Church of England, schooled at the Sandicroft School in Northwich
 Harold Drinkwater (1855-1925) physician and botanical artist, born and raised in Northwich
 Geoffrey Cheshire FBA (1886 in Northwich – 1978) an English barrister, scholar and influential writer on law
 Arthur Dodd (1919 in Northwich – 2011) served in the British Army during WWII and was a Prisoner of War at Auschwitz
 Mary-Ann Ochota (born 1981 in Northwich) a British broadcaster and anthropologist specialising in archaeology, social history and adventure factual television

Twin town

Northwich is twinned with:

  Dole, France
  Carlow, Republic of Ireland

See also

Salt in Cheshire
Brunner Mond
Listed buildings in Northwich
Winnington Hall
Holy Trinity Church, Northwich
Market Fire

References

External links

Cheshire West and Chester Council
Visit Northwich
GoNorthwich
Brunner Mond
Northwich Town Council
Northwich and Rural North community website

 
Civil parishes in Cheshire
Towns in Cheshire